Michel Estephan (born 15 March 1959) is a Lebanese judoka. He competed in the men's extra-lightweight event at the 1984 Summer Olympics.

References

1959 births
Living people
Lebanese male judoka
Olympic judoka of Lebanon
Judoka at the 1984 Summer Olympics
Place of birth missing (living people)